2019 XS is a small Apollo near-Earth asteroid discovered on 2 December 2019 by the Mount Lemmon Survey in Arizona, United States. It passed  from Earth on 9 November 2021 at 03:48 UTC, after which observations were checked by the International Asteroid Warning Network for timing and astrometric accuracy. During the close pass, the asteroid trailed across the far Southern Hemisphere to the Northern Hemisphere and reached a peak apparent magnitude of 13. A total of 957 observations were collected by Minor Planet Center as part of the International Asteroid Warning Network's campaign.

2019 XS is well-observed with a long observation arc of over 21 years, enough to distinguish subtle changes in its orbit over time due non-gravitational acceleration by the Yarkovsky effect. Highly precise radar observations by NASA's Goldstone Solar System Radar on 11 November 2021 have significantly constrained the asteroid's orbit and 2021 close approach distance to within a few kilometres.

Continuous photometric observations by the Center for Solar System Studies in Landers, California show an irregular light curve for 2019 XS, signifying that the asteroid is in a tumbling rotation state. The light curve of 2019 XS appears to display two overlapping periods of 2.35 and 3.01 hours, which could possibly be associated with the asteroid's rotation and precession.

Exploration 
2019 XS may be a potential target for the LICIACube mission after the completion of its primary mission.

See also 
 , another near-Earth asteroid with a dedicated IAWN timing campaign

References

External links 
 2019 XS: Timing Assessment, International Asteroid Warning Network, 3 October 2021
 Goldstone Radar Observations Planning: Orpheus, 2004 UE, 2019 XS, and 2010 VK139, Lance A. M. Benner, Jet Propulsion Laboratory
 
 
 

Discoveries by MLS
Minor planet object articles (unnumbered)
20210216

20191202